The Paris Waltz (French: La Valse de Paris) is a 1950 French-Italian historical musical film directed by Marcel Achard and starring Yvonne Printemps, Pierre Fresnay and Jacques Charon. It portrays the life of the nineteenth century composer Jacques Offenbach. It was shot at the Billancourt Studios in Paris. The film's sets were designed by the art director Robert Clavel.

Synopsis
In France during the Second Empire, Jacques Offenbach is in love with the soprano Hortense Schneider. Their complex relationship, including several betrayals, gives him inspiration for some of his greatest work.

Main cast
Yvonne Printemps as Hortense Schneider
Pierre Fresnay as Jacques Offenbach
Jacques Charon as Jean-François Berthelier
Noëlle Norman as Marie Pradeau
Robert Manuel as José Dupuis
Pierre Dux as General Danicheff
Denise Provence as Brigitte
Jacques Castelot as Le duc de Morny
Raymonde Allain as L'impératrice Eugénie
Claude Sainval as Le prince
Lucien Nat	as Napoleon III
Léa Gray as La duchesse de Morny
André Roussin as Henri Meilhac
Renée Sénac as La mère d'Hortense
Gabriel Gobin as Chavert - le régisseur (as Gobin)

References

Bibliography
 Hayward, Susan. French Costume Drama of the 1950s: Fashioning Politics in Film. Intellect Books, 2010.

External links
 

1950 films
1950s biographical films
1950s historical musical films
French biographical films
French historical musical films
Italian historical musical films
1950s French-language films
Biographical films about singers
Films about classical music and musicians
Films about composers
Films about opera
Films set in the 1850s
Films set in the 1860s
Films set in Paris
Cultural depictions of Napoleon III
Lux Film films
French black-and-white films
Italian black-and-white films
1950s French films
1950s Italian films
Films shot at Billancourt Studios